Bzenica is a village and municipality in Žiar nad Hronom District in the Banská Bystrica Region of central Slovakia.

History
The village was first mentioned in old charters in 1326  (Bezenche) as belonging to Levice feudatories. In the 16th century it passed to Repište and after to Banská Štiavnica. In the 16th century it belonged to noble families: Dóczy, Stefan and Zobony. In 1601 it passed to Šašov.

Famous people
Andrej Kmeť, scientist

Genealogical resources
The records for genealogical research are available at the state archive "Statny Archiv in Banska Bystrica, Slovakia"
 Roman Catholic church records (births/marriages/deaths): 1798-1905 (parish B)
 Lutheran church records (births/marriages/deaths): 1812-1895 (parish B)

See also
 List of municipalities and towns in Slovakia

References

External links
 
 
http://www.e-obce.sk/obec/bzenica/bzenica.html
Surnames of living people in Bzenica

Villages and municipalities in Žiar nad Hronom District